Dramatic Structure: The Shaping of Experience is a nonfiction book written by Jackson G. Barry and published in 1973 by the University of California Press.

References

American non-fiction books
University of California Press books
Books about literary theory
Literary criticism
1973 non-fiction books